Brosset is a surname. Notable people with the surname include: 

Colette Brosset (1922–2007), French actress, writer, and choreographer
Marie-Félicité Brosset (1802–1880), French orientalist